The James Bothwell Water Tank House is a water tank house located on a farm  north of Jerome, Idaho. The building was constructed circa 1926 for James Bothwell, a local lawyer and farmland investor. Bothwell built the tank house and a well on the property to help provide water for the farm. The building was constructed with lava rock by stonemason John Gott, who was trained in Germany. It is one of two original rock water tank houses remaining in Jerome and Lincoln Counties.

The building was added to the National Register of Historic Places on September 8, 1983.

References

See also

 List of National Historic Landmarks in Idaho
 National Register of Historic Places listings in Jerome County, Idaho

1926 establishments in Idaho
Agricultural buildings and structures on the National Register of Historic Places in Idaho
Buildings and structures in Jerome County, Idaho
Infrastructure completed in 1926
National Register of Historic Places in Jerome County, Idaho
Water tanks on the National Register of Historic Places